Labyrinth (German: Labyrinth der Leidenschaften, Italian: Neurose) is a 1959 German-Italian drama film directed by Rolf Thiele and starring Nadja Tiller, Peter van Eyck and Amedeo Nazzari.

Cast
 Nadja Tiller as Georgia  
 Peter van Eyck as Ron Stevens  
 Amedeo Nazzari as Professor De Lattre  
 Nicole Badal as Mother Superior  
 Matteo Spinola as Armand  
 Elisabeth Flickenschildt as Frau Gretzer  
 Benno Hoffmann as Beckmeyer  
 Tilla Durieux as Schwester Celestine  
 Fritz Eckhardt as Khan  
 Piera Arico as Brotkugel  
 Harald Kreutzberg as Sir Agamemnon  
 Hanne Wieder as Priorin  
 Werner Finck as Präsident  
 Ljuba Welitsch as Ljubas  
 Hans Leibelt as Padre Jeannot  
 Ina Duscha as Juliette  
 Tilo von Berlepsch as Graf  
 Bobby Todd as Generaldirektor  
 Eduard Linkers as Jacques  
 Hugo Lindinger as Swoboda  
 Anna Maria Lussi as Michèle  
 Gregor von Rezzori as Schweizer Zöllner

References

Bibliography 
 Bock, Hans-Michael & Bergfelder, Tim. The Concise CineGraph. Encyclopedia of German Cinema. Berghahn Books, 2009.

External links 
 

1959 films
1959 drama films
German drama films
Italian drama films
West German films
1950s German-language films
Films directed by Rolf Thiele
UFA GmbH films
1950s Italian films
1950s German films